Operation Panther may refer to:

 Operation Panther (2013), a French military operation in Mali launched in February 2013
Operation Panther (1940), German attack on Greece   
 Operation Panther (1943, Yugoslavia),  German anti-partisan operation at Mesovan Pass in Southeastern Croatia, Yugoslavia
 Operation Panther (1943, Greece),  German anti-partisan operation in Greece
 Operation Panther (1943, USSR), German anti-partisan operation near Kursk, USSR